Retail is the sale of goods and services to consumers, in contrast to wholesaling, which is sale to business or institutional customers. A retailer purchases goods in large quantities from manufacturers, directly or through a wholesaler, and then sells in smaller quantities to consumers for a profit. Retailers are the final link in the supply chain from producers to consumers.

Retail markets and shops have a very ancient history, dating back to antiquity. Some of the earliest retailers were itinerant peddlers. Over the centuries, retail shops were transformed from little more than "rude booths" to the sophisticated shopping malls of the modern era. In the digital age, an increasing number of retailers are seeking to reach broader markets by selling through multiple channels, including both bricks and mortar and online retailing. Digital technologies are also affecting the way that consumers pay for goods and services. Retailing support services may also include the provision of credit, delivery services, advisory services, stylist services and a range of other supporting services.

Most modern retailers typically make a variety of strategic level decisions including the type of store, the market to be served, the optimal product assortment, customer service, supporting services, and the store's overall market positioning. Once the strategic retail plan is in place, retailers devise the retail mix which includes product, price, place, promotion, personnel, and presentation.

Etymology
The word retail comes from the Old French verb tailler, meaning "to cut off, clip, pare, divide in terms of tailoring" (c. 1365). It was first recorded as a noun in 1433 with the meaning of "a sale in small quantities" from the Middle French verb retailler meaning "a piece cut off, shred, scrap, paring". At the present, the meaning of the word retail (in English, French, Dutch, German and Spanish) refers to the sale of small quantities of items to consumers (as opposed to wholesale).

Definition and explanation

Retail refers to the activity of selling goods or services directly to consumers or end-users. Some retailers may sell to business customers, and such sales are termed non-retail activity. In some jurisdictions or regions, legal definitions of retail specify that at least 80 percent of sales activity must be to end-users.

Retailing often occurs in retail stores or service establishments, but may also occur through direct selling such as through vending machines, door-to-door sales or electronic channels.
Although the idea of retail is often associated with the purchase of goods, the term may be applied to service providers that sell to consumers. Retail service providers include retail banking, tourism, insurance, private healthcare, private education, private security firms, legal firms, publishers, public transport, and others. For example, a tourism provider might have a retail division that books travel and accommodation for consumers plus a wholesale division that purchases blocks of accommodation, hospitality, transport, and sightseeing which are subsequently packaged into a holiday tour for sale to retail travel agents.

Some retailers badge their stores as "wholesale outlets" offering "wholesale prices." While this practice may encourage consumers to imagine that they have access to lower prices, while being prepared to trade-off reduced prices for cramped in-store environments, in a strictly legal sense, a store that sells the majority of its merchandise direct to consumers, is defined as a retailer rather than a wholesaler. Different jurisdictions set parameters for the ratio of consumer to business sales that define a retail business.

History 

Retail markets have existed since ancient times. Archaeological evidence for trade, probably involving barter systems, dates back more than 10,000 years. As civilizations grew, barter was replaced with retail trade involving coinage. Selling and buying are thought to have emerged in Asia Minor (modern Turkey) in around the 7th-millennium BCE. In ancient Greece, markets operated within the agora, an open space where, on market days, goods were displayed on mats or temporary stalls. In ancient Rome, trade took place in the forum. The Roman forum was arguably the earliest example of a permanent retail shop-front. Recent research suggests that China exhibited a rich history of early retail systems. From as early as 200 BCE, Chinese packaging and branding were used to signal family, place names and product quality, and the use of government imposed product branding was used between 600 and 900 CE. Eckhart and Bengtsson have argued that during the Song Dynasty (960–1127), Chinese society developed a consumerist culture, where a high level of consumption was attainable for a wide variety of ordinary consumers rather than just the elite.

In Medieval England and Europe, relatively few permanent shops were to be found; instead, customers walked into the tradesman's workshops where they discussed purchasing options directly with tradesmen. In the more populous cities, a small number of shops were beginning to emerge by the 13th century. Outside the major cities, most consumable purchases were made through markets or fairs. Market-places appear to have emerged independently outside Europe. The Grand Bazaar in Istanbul is often cited as the world's oldest continuously operating market; its construction began in 1455. The Spanish conquistadors wrote glowingly of markets in the Americas. In the 15th century, the Mexica (Aztec) market of Tlatelolco was the largest in all the Americas.

By the 17th century, permanent shops with more regular trading hours were beginning to supplant markets and fairs as the main retail outlet. Provincial shopkeepers were active in almost every English market town. As the number of shops grew, they underwent a transformation. The trappings of a modern shop, which had been entirely absent from the sixteenth- and early seventeenth-century store, gradually made way for store interiors and shopfronts that are more familiar to modern shoppers. Prior to the eighteenth century, the typical retail store had no counter, display cases, chairs, mirrors, changing rooms, etc. However, the opportunity for the customer to browse merchandise, touch and feel products began to be available, with retail innovations from the late 17th and early 18th centuries.

By the late 18th century, grand shopping arcades began to emerge across Europe and in the Antipodes. A shopping arcade refers to a multiple-vendor space, operating under a covered roof. Typically, the roof was constructed of glass to allow for natural light and to reduce the need for candles or electric lighting. Some of the earliest examples of shopping arcade appeared in Paris, due to its lack of pavement for pedestrians. While the arcades were the province of the bourgeoisie, a new type of retail venture emerged to serve the needs of the working poor. John Stuart Mill wrote about the rise of the co-operative retail store, which he witnessed first-hand in the mid-nineteenth century.

The modern era of retailing is defined as the period from the industrial revolution to the 21st century. In major cities, the department store emerged in the mid- to late 19th century, and permanently reshaped shopping habits, and redefined concepts of service and luxury. Many of the early department stores were more than just a retail emporium; rather they were venues where shoppers could spend their leisure time and be entertained. Retail, using mail order, came of age during the mid-19th century. Although catalogue sales had been used since the 15th century, this method of retailing was confined to a few industries such as the sale of books and seeds. However, improvements in transport and postal services led several entrepreneurs on either side of the Atlantic to experiment with catalogue sales.

In the post-war period, an American architect, Victor Gruen developed a concept for a shopping mall; a planned, self-contained shopping complex complete with an indoor plaza, statues, planting schemes, piped music, and car-parking. Gruen's vision was to create a shopping atmosphere where people felt so comfortable, they would spend more time in the environment, thereby enhancing opportunities for purchasing. The first of these malls opened at Northland Mall near Detroit in 1954. Throughout the twentieth century, a trend towards larger store footprints became discernible. The average size of a U.S. supermarket grew from  square feet in 1991 to  square feet in 2000. By the end of the twentieth century, stores were using labels such as "mega-stores" and "warehouse" stores to reflect their growing size. The upward trend of increasing retail space was not consistent across nations and led in the early 21st century to a 2-fold difference in square footage per capita between the United States and Europe.

As the 21st century takes shape, some indications suggest that large retail stores have come under increasing pressure from online sales models and that reductions in store size are evident. Under such competition and other issues such as business debt, there has been a noted business disruption called the retail apocalypse in recent years which several retail businesses, especially in North America, are sharply reducing their number of stores, or going out of business entirely.

Retail strategy

The distinction between "strategic" and "managerial" decision-making is commonly used to distinguish "two phases having different goals and based on different conceptual tools. Strategic planning concerns the choice of policies aiming at improving the competitive position of the firm, taking account of challenges and opportunities proposed by the competitive environment. On the other hand, managerial decision-making is focused on the implementation of specific targets."

In retailing, the strategic plan is designed to set out the vision and provide guidance for retail decision-makers and provide an outline of how the product and service mix will optimize customer satisfaction. As part of the strategic planning process, it is customary for strategic planners to carry out a detailed environmental scan which seeks to identify trends and opportunities in the competitive environment, market environment, economic environment and statutory-political environment. The retail strategy is normally devised or reviewed every three to five years by the chief executive officer. The profit margins of retailers depend largely on their ability to achieve market competitive transaction costs.

The strategic retail analysis typically includes following elements:

 Market analysis – Market size, stage of market, market competitiveness, market attractiveness, market trends
 Customer analysis – Market segmentation, demographic, geographic, and psychographic profile, values and attitudes, shopping habits, brand preferences, analysis of needs and wants, and media habits
 Internal analysis – Other capacities including human resource capability, technological capability, financial capability, ability to generate scale economies or economies of scope, trade relations, reputation, positioning, and past performance
 Competition analysis – Availability of substitutes, competitor's strengths and weaknesses, perceptual mapping, competitive trends
 Review of product mix – :: Sales per square foot, stock-turnover rates, profitability per product line
 Review of distribution channels – Lead-times between placing order and delivery, cost of distribution, cost efficiency of intermediaries
 Evaluation of the economics of the strategy – Cost-benefit analysis of planned activities

At the conclusion of the retail analysis, retail marketers should have a clear idea of which groups of customers are to be the target of marketing activities. Not all elements are, however, equal, often with demographics, shopping motivations, and spending directing consumer activities. Retail research studies suggest that there is a strong relationship between a store's positioning and the socio-economic status of customers. In addition, the retail strategy, including service quality, has a significant and positive association with customer loyalty. A marketing strategy effectively outlines all key aspects of firms' targeted audience, demographics, preferences. In a highly competitive market, the retail strategy sets up long-term sustainability. It focuses on customer relationships, stressing the importance of added value, customer satisfaction and highlights how the store's market positioning appeals to targeted groups of customers.

Retail marketing

A retail mix is devised for the purpose of coordinating day-to-day tactical decisions. The retail marketing mix typically consists of six broad decision layers including product decisions, place decisions, promotion, price, personnel and presentation (also known as physical evidence). The retail mix is loosely based on the marketing mix, but has been expanded and modified in line with the unique needs of the retail context. A number of scholars have argued for an expanded marketing, mix with the inclusion of two new Ps, namely, Personnel and Presentation since these contribute to the customer's unique retail experience and are the principal basis for retail differentiation. Yet other scholars argue that the Retail Format (i.e. retail formula) should be included. The modified retail marketing mix that is most commonly cited in textbooks is often called the 6 Ps of retailing (see diagram at right).The primary product-related decisions facing the retailer are the product assortment (what product lines, how many lines and which brands to carry); the type of customer service (high contact through to self-service) and the availability of support services (e.g. credit terms, delivery services, after sales care). These decisions depend on careful analysis of the market, demand, competition as well as the retailer's skills and expertise.

Customer service is the "sum of acts and elements that allow consumers to receive what they need or desire from [the] retail establishment." Retailers must decide whether to provide a full service outlet or minimal service outlet, such as no-service in the case of vending machines; self-service with only basic sales assistance or a full service operation as in many boutiques and speciality stores. In addition, the retailer needs to make decisions about sales support such as customer delivery and after sales customer care.

Place decisions are primarily concerned with consumer access and may involve location, space utilisation and operating hours. Retailers may consider a range of both qualitative and quantitative factors to evaluate to potential sites under consideration. Macro factors include market characteristics (demographic, economic and socio-cultural), demand, competition and infrastructure (e.g. the availability of power, roads, public transport systems).  Micro factors include the size of the site (e.g. availability of parking), access for delivery vehicles. A major retail trend has been the shift to multi-channel retailing. To counter the disruption caused by online retail, many bricks and mortar retailers have entered the online retail space, by setting up online catalogue sales and e-commerce websites. However, many retailers have noticed that consumers behave differently when shopping online. For instance, in terms of choice of online platform, shoppers tend to choose the online site of their preferred retailer initially, but as they gain more experience in online shopping, they become less loyal and more likely to switch to other retail sites. Online stores are usually available 24 hours a day, and many consumers across the globe have Internet access both at work and at home.

The broad pricing strategy is normally established in the company's overall strategic plan. In the case of chain stores, the pricing strategy would be set by head office. Broadly, there are six approaches to pricing strategy mentioned in the marketing literature: operations-oriented, revenue-oriented, customer-oriented, value-based, relationship-oriented, and socially-oriented. When decision-makers have determined the broad approach to pricing (i.e., the pricing strategy), they turn their attention to pricing tactics. Tactical pricing decisions are shorter term prices, designed to accomplish specific short-term goals. Pricing tactics that are commonly used in retail include discount pricing, everyday low prices, high-low pricing, loss leaders, product bundling, promotional pricing, and psychological pricing. Retailers must also plan for customer preferred payment modes – e.g. cash, credit, lay-by, Electronic Funds Transfer at Point-of-Sale (EFTPOS). All payment options require some type of handling and attract costs. Contrary to common misconception, price is not the most important factor for consumers, when deciding to buy a product.

Because patronage at a retail outlet varies, flexibility in scheduling is desirable. Employee scheduling software is sold, which, using known patterns of customer patronage, more or less reliably predicts the need for staffing for various functions at times of the year, day of the month or week, and time of day. Usually needs vary widely. Conforming staff utilization to staffing needs requires a flexible workforce which is available when needed but does not have to be paid when they are not, part-time workers; as of 2012 70% of retail workers in the United States were part-time. This may result in financial problems for the workers, who while they are required to be available at all times if their work hours are to be maximized, may not have sufficient income to meet their family and other obligations.  Retailers can employ different techniques to enhance sales volume and to improve the customer experience, such as Add-on, Upsell or Cross-sell; Selling on value; and knowing when to close the sale.

Transactional marketing aims to find target consumers, then negotiate, trade, and finally end relationships to complete the transaction. In this one-time transaction process, both parties aim to maximize their own interests. As a result, transactional marketing raises follow-up problems such as poor after-sales service quality and a lack of feedback channels for both parties. In addition, because retail enterprises needed to redevelop client relationships for each transaction, marketing costs were high and customer retention was low. All these downsides to transactional marketing gradually pushed the retail industry towards establishing long-term cooperative relationships with customers. Through this lens, enterprises began to focus on the process from transaction to relationship.
While expanding the sales market and attracting new customers is very important for the retail industry, it is also important to establish and maintain long term good relationships with previous customers, hence the name of the underlying concept, "relational marketing". Under this concept, retail enterprises value and attempt to improve relationships with customers, as customer relationships are conducive to maintaining stability in the current competitive retail market, and are also the future of retail enterprises.

Presentation refers to the physical evidence that signals the retail image. Physical evidence may include a diverse range of elements – the store itself including premises, offices, exterior facade and interior layout, websites, delivery vans, warehouses, staff uniforms. The environment in which the retail service encounter occurs is sometimes known as the retail servicescape. The store environment consists of many elements such as aromas, the physical environment (furnishings, layout, and functionality), ambient conditions (lighting, air temperature, and music) as well as signs, symbols, and artifacts (e.g. sales promotions, shelf space, sample stations, visual communications). Retail designers pay close attention to the front of the store, which is known as the decompression zone. In order to maximize the number of selling opportunities, retailers generally want customers to spend more time in a retail store. However, this must be balanced against customer expectations surrounding convenience, access and realistic waiting times. The way that brands are displayed is also part of the overall retail design. Where a product is placed on the shelves has implications for purchase likelihood as a result of visibility and access. Ambient conditions, such as lighting, temperature and music, are also part of the overall retail environment. It is common for a retail store to play music that relates to their target market.

Shopper profiles
Two different strands of research have investigated shopper behaviour. One is primarily concerned with shopper motivations. The other stream of research seeks to segment shoppers according to common, shared characteristics. To some extent, these streams of research are inter-related, but each stream offers different types of insights into shopper behaviour.

Babin et al. carried out some of the earliest investigations into shopper motivations and identified two broad motives: utilitarian and hedonic. Utilitarian motivations are task-related and rational. For the shopper with utilitarian motives, purchasing is a work-related task that is to be accomplished in the most efficient and expedient manner. On the other hand, hedonic motives refer to pleasure. The shopper with hedonic motivations views shopping as a form of escapism where they are free to indulge fantasy and freedom. Hedonic shoppers are more involved in the shopping experience.

Many different shopper profiles can be identified. Retailers develop customised segmentation analyses for each unique outlet. However, it is possible to identify a number of broad shopper profiles. One of the most well-known and widely cited shopper typologies is that developed by Sproles and Kendal in the mid-1980s. Sproles and Kendall's consumer typology has been shown to be relatively consistent across time and across cultures. Their typology is based on the consumer's approach to making purchase decisions.
 Quality conscious/Perfectionist: Quality-consciousness is characterised by a consumer's search for the very best quality in products; quality conscious consumers tend to shop systematically making more comparisons and shopping around.
 Brand-conscious: Brand-consciousness is characterised by a tendency to buy expensive, well-known brands or designer labels. Those who score high on brand-consciousness tend to believe that the higher prices are an indicator of quality and exhibit a preference for department stores or top-tier retail outlets.
 Recreation-conscious/Hedonistic: Recreational shopping is characterised by the consumer's engagement in the purchase process. Those who score high on recreation-consciousness regard shopping itself as a form of enjoyment.
 Price-conscious: A consumer who exhibits price-and-value consciousness. Price-conscious shoppers carefully shop around seeking lower prices, sales or discounts and are motivated by obtaining the best value for money
 Novelty/fashion-conscious: characterised by a consumer's tendency to seek out new products or new experiences for the sake of excitement; who gain excitement from seeking new things; they like to keep up-to-date with fashions and trends, variety-seeking is associated with this dimension.
 Impulsive: Impulsive consumers are somewhat careless in making purchase decisions, buy on the spur of the moment and are not overly concerned with expenditure levels or obtaining value. Those who score high on impulsive dimensions tend not to be engaged with the object at either a cognitive or emotional level.
 Confused (by overchoice): characterised by a consumer's confusion caused by too many product choices, too many stores or an overload of product information; tend to experience information overload.
 Habitual/brand loyal: characterised by a consumer's tendency to follow a routine purchase pattern on each purchase occasion; consumers have favourite brands or stores and have formed habits in choosing; the purchase decision does not involve much evaluation or shopping around.

Some researchers have adapted Sproles and Kendall's methodology for use in specific countries or cultural groups. Consumer decision styles are important for retailers and marketers because they describe behaviours that are relatively stable over time and for this reason, they are useful for market segmentation.

Types of retail outlets 

Retail formats (also known as retail formulas) influence the consumer's store choice and addresses the consumer's expectations. At its most basic level, a retail format is a simple marketplace, that is; a location where goods and services are exchanged. In some parts of the world, the retail sector is still dominated by small family-run stores, but large retail chains are increasingly dominating the sector, because they can exert considerable buying power and pass on the savings in the form of lower prices. Many of these large retail chains also produce their own private labels which compete alongside manufacturer brands. Considerable consolidation of retail stores has changed the retail landscape, transferring power away from wholesalers and into the hands of the large retail chains.  In Britain and Europe, the retail sale of goods is designated as a service activity. The European Service Directive applies to all retail trade including periodic markets, street traders and peddlers.

Retail stores may be classified by the type of product carried. Softline retailers sell goods that are consumed after a single-use, or have a limited life (typically under three years) in they are normally consumed. Soft goods include clothing, other fabrics, footwear, toiletries, cosmetics, medicines and stationery. Grocery stores, including supermarkets and hypermarkets, along with convenience stores carry a mix of food products and consumable household items such as detergents, cleansers, personal hygiene products. Retailers selling consumer durables are sometimes known as hardline retailers – automobiles, appliances, electronics, furniture, sporting goods, lumber, etc., and parts for them. Specialist retailers operate in many industries such as the arts e.g. green grocers, contemporary art galleries, bookstores, handicrafts, musical instruments, gift shops.

Types of retail outlets by marketing strategy include shopping arcade, anchor store, bazaar, boutique, category killer, chain store, co-operative store convenience store, department stores, discount stores, e-tailer, general store, give-away shop, hawkers also known as peddlers, costermongers or street vendors, high street store, hypermarket, pop-up retail, marketplace, market square, shopping center, speciality store, supermarket variety stores, vending machine, no frills, warehouse clubs, warehouse stores, automated retail, big-box stores, second-hand shop, and charity shop. Retailers can opt for a format as each provides different retail mix to its customers based on their customer demographics, lifestyle and purchase behavior. An effective format will determine how products are display products, as well as how target customers are attracted.

Challenges
To achieve and maintain a foothold in an existing market, a prospective retail establishment must overcome the following hurdles:
 regulatory barriers including:
 restrictions on real-estate purchases, especially as imposed by local governments and against "big-box" chain retailers
 restrictions on foreign investment in retailers, in terms of both absolute amount of financing provided and percentage share of voting stock (e.g. common stock) purchased
 unfavorable taxation structures, especially those designed to penalize or keep out "big box" retailers (see "Regulatory" above)
 absence of developed supply-chain and integrated IT management
 high competitiveness among existing market participants and resulting low profit margins, caused in part by:
 constant advances in product design resulting in constant threat of product obsolescence and price declines for existing inventory
 lack of a properly-educated and/or -trained work-force, often including management, caused in part by loss in business
 lack of educational infrastructure enabling prospective market entrants to respond to the above challenges
 direct e-tailing (for example, through the Internet) and direct delivery to consumers from manufacturers and suppliers, cutting out any retail middle man.

Method
When discussing the impact of technology on shopping and retail, e-commerce is often the first thing that comes to mind for retailers. However, technologies such as big data, artificial intelligence, computer vision and the Internet of Things have used data to transform every part of the shopping experience, from browsing to checkout.

It is important for organizations to embrace digital disruption in order to gain a competitive advantage. When an industry experiences digital disruption, it typically signals that consumer needs are shifting. Retailers enhance their analytics process and make better informed decisions thanks to big data, artificial intelligence, computer vision, and the Internet of Things. The use of data by retailers is mostly evident in the following aspects, based on the above-mentioned new technologies:

 Enhance marketing by Personalizing customer experience
 Optimize supply chain management
 Adjust prices to maximize profits

Consolidation
Among retailers and retails chains a lot of consolidation has appeared over the last couple of decades. Between 1988 and 2010, worldwide 40,788 mergers & acquisitions with a total known value of US$2.255 trillion have been announced. The largest transactions with involvement of retailers in/from the United States have been: the acquisition of Albertson's Inc. for US$17 billion in 2006, the merger between Federated Department Stores Inc with May Department Stores valued at 16.5 bil. USD in 2005 – now Macy's, and the merger between Kmart Holding Corp and Sears Roebuck & Co with a value of US$10.9 billion in 2004.

Between 1985 and 2018 there have been 46,755 mergers or acquisitions conducted globally in the retail sector (either acquirer or target from the retail industry). These deals cumulate to an overall known value of around US$2,561 billion. The three major Retail M&A waves took place in 2000, 2007 and lately in 2017. However the all-time high in terms of number of deals was in 2016 with more than 2,700 deals. In terms of added value 2007 set the record with the US$225 billion.

Here is a list of the top ten largest deals (ranked by volume) in the Retail Industry:

Statistics

Global top ten retailers

As of 2016, China was the largest retail market in the world.

Competition
Retail stores may or may not have competitors close enough to affect their pricing, product availability, and other operations. A 2006 survey found that only 38% of retail stores in India believed they faced more than slight competition. Competition also affected less than half of retail stores in Kazakhstan, Bulgaria, and Azerbaijan. In all countries the main competition was domestic, not foreign.

Retail trade provides 9% of all jobs in India and 14% of GDP.

Statistics for national retail sales

United States

The National Retail Federation and Kantar annually rank the nation's top retailers according to sales. The National Retail Federation also separately ranks the 100 fastest-growing U.S. retailers based on increases in domestic sales.

Since 1951, the U.S. Census Bureau has published the Retail Sales report every month. It is a measure of consumer spending, an important indicator of the US GDP. Retail firms provide data on the dollar value of their retail sales and inventories. A sample of 12,000 firms is included in the final survey and 5,000 in the advanced one. The advanced estimated data is based on a subsample from the US CB complete retail & food services sample.

Retail is the largest private-sector employer in the United States, supporting 52 million working Americans.

Central Europe
In 2011, the grocery market in six countries of Central Europe was worth nearly €107bn, 2.8% more than the previous year when expressed in local currencies. The increase was generated foremost by the discount stores and supermarket segments, and was driven by the skyrocketing prices of foodstuffs. This information is based on the latest PMR report entitled Grocery retail in Central Europe 2012

World

National accounts show a combined total of retail and wholesale trade, with hotels and restaurants. in 2012 the sector provides over a fifth of GDP in tourist-oriented island economies, as well as in other major countries such as Brazil, Pakistan, Russia, and Spain. In all four of the latter countries, this fraction is an increase over 1970, but there are other countries where the sector has declined since 1970, sometimes in absolute terms, where other sectors have replaced its role in the economy. In the United States the sector has declined from 19% of GDP to 14%, though it has risen in absolute terms from $4,500 to $7,400 per capita per year. In China the sector has grown from 7.3% to 11.5%, and in India even more, from 8.4% to 18.7%. Emarketer predicts China will have the largest retail market in the world in 2016.

In 2016, China became the largest retail market in the world.

In the Republic of Armenia, retail trade has been increasing recently. In October 2022, it increased by 23.1% year by year, which was the most considerable rise since April 2021, faster than the 20.7 percent increase recorded a month earlier. Retail dropped by 1.9% after accumulating 2.1%in the earlier month. For the first 10 months of 2022, retail sales increased by 15.5% by measuring the exact time of 2021. Among its bordering countries, on retail trade percentage of GDP, Armenia ranks more increased than Turkey, but it is still lower than Georgia.

See also

Types of sales person:

Types of store or shop:

Influential thinkers in sales and retail:
 Dale Carnegie: author and lecturer; proponent of salesmanship, public speaking and self-improvement
 E. St. Elmo Lewis: salesmen for NCR and developer of the AIDA model of selling
 William Thomas Rawleigh: founder of Rawleigh's company with one of the largest travelling sales teams in the United States
 Harry Gordon Selfridge: founder of UK Selfridges; redefined shopping away from essential errand to a pleasurable activity; was noted for introducing a touch of theatre and celebrity appearances to department stores; also wrote the book, The Romance of Commerce published in 1918.
 Walter Dill Scott: psychologist and author; wrote a number of books on the psychology of selling in the early twentieth century
 Thomas J. Watson: salesman at NCR and CEO of IBM; often described as the "greatest American salesman"

References

Further reading
 Adburgham, A., Shopping in Style: London from the Restoration to Edwardian Elegance, London, Thames and Hudson, 1979
 Alexander, A., "The Study of British Retail History: Progress and Agenda", in The Routledge Companion to Marketing History, D.G. Brian Jones and Mark Tadajewski (eds.), Oxon, Routledge, 2016, pp. 155–72
 Feinberg, R.A. and Meoli, J., [Online: "A A Brief History of the Mall Brief History of the Mall"], in Advances in Consumer Research, Volume 18, Rebecca H. Holman and Michael R. Solomon (eds.), Provo, UT: Association for Consumer Research, 1991, pp. 426–27
 Hollander, S. C., "Who and What are Important in Retailing and Marketing History: A Basis for Discussion", in S.C. Hollander and R. Savitt (eds.) First North American Workshop on Historical Research in Marketing, Lansing, MI: Michigan State University, 1983, pp. 35–40.
 Jones, F., "Retail Stores in the United States, 1800–1860", Journal of Marketing, October 1936, pp. 135–40
 
 Kowinski, W. S., The Malling of America: An Inside Look at the Great Consumer Paradise, New York, William Morrow, 1985
 Furnee, J. H., and Lesger, C. (eds), The Landscape of Consumption: Shopping Streets and Cultures in Western Europe, 1600–1900, Springer, 2014
 MacKeith, M., The History and Conservation of Shopping Arcades, Mansell Publishing, 1986
 Nystrom, P. H., "Retailing in Retrospect and Prospect", in H.G. Wales (ed.) Changing Perspectives in Marketing, Urbana: University of Illinois Press, 19951, pp. 117–38.
 Stobard, J., Sugar and Spice: Grocers and Groceries in Provincial England, 1650–1830, Oxford University Press, 2016
Underhill, Paco, Call of the Mall: The Author of Why We Buy on the Geography of Shopping, Simon & Schuster, 2004

External links

 ECRoPEDIA – Free Global Collection of Retail/FMCG Best practices by ECR Community
 Investopedia.The Industry Handbook: The Retailing Industry
 National Retail Federation (U.S.-based trade association)

Marketing strategy
Merchandising